Scotiabank Centre (formerly known as Halifax Metro Centre) is the largest multi-purpose facility in Atlantic Canada, located in the heart of downtown Halifax, Nova Scotia, Canada. The main entrances to the building are located on Brunswick Street, at the corner of Duke Street and Carmichael Street, at the foot of Citadel Hill. The building's box office entrance is located on Carmichael Street.

History

The arena was opened on February 17, 1978 as the Halifax Metro Centre, and was built into the ground to compensate for the steep elevation of the land it occupies. Spectators can see cars at street level, outside, while watching an event.

In December 2007, an Ozzy Osbourne concert sold out in nine minutes, setting a box office ticket record for the Halifax Metro Centre. In July 2008, the Halifax Metro Centre also set a record sell-out (25,000 tickets sold in 40 minutes), for two back-to-back Elton John concerts held in late September 2008. In April 2012, the Halifax Mooseheads sold out game 6 of the Quebec Major Junior Hockey League semifinals in 20 minutes. On May 9, 2013, QMJHL Presidents Cup final Game 5 sold-out in record time 11 minutes, setting another attendance mark for the Scotiabank Centre.

The facility is owned by the municipality but operated by Events East.

On June 25, 2014, it was announced that Scotiabank had won the naming rights to the facility and that the Metro Centre would be renamed the Scotiabank Centre. The facility officially opened its doors as the rebranded Scotiabank Centre on September 19, 2014.

Arena information

The Scotiabank Centre originally featured a full ring of bright orange seats around the playing surface, which is known as the "lower bowl". It also has an incomplete "upper bowl" on each side of the arena facing rink-side (court-side) with seats of the same colour. In the mid to late 1990s, there were numerous renovations to the arena, including the addition of 43 SkyBoxes and 11 "Executive Suites". The addition of the SkyBoxes has since partially obscured views for people sitting high up in the upper bowl. Views of some or all of the ice surface from the uppermost rows of seating is either partially or fully blocked by the boxes. To help mitigate this issue, video projection equipment was installed that projects onto the exterior rear walls of the boxes: If a video recording is being produced for an event, then a live feed of the video may be projected for the benefit of people in the obstructed parts of the upper bowl. Before the 2002–03 ice hockey season, in preparation for the World Junior Ice Hockey Championship, a new scoreboard and "SilverVision" LED screens were added. The arena concourses feature photographs of the various events that have taken place at the Scotiabank Centre, with one side featuring entertainment events and the other featuring sporting events. It currently has a seating capacity of 10,595 for ice hockey. The building is connected to the Downtown Halifax Link system.

When the rebranded Scotiabank Centre was unveiled in September 2014, plans to use funding received from the naming rights partnership for capital reinvestment in the facility were also announced. Started from January 2015 to September 2015 the Scotiabank Centre renovated the concessions adding Taste 902, Asian, Links, Donairs, etc. The bathrooms were also renovated, and the original orange seats were replaced with new navy blue ones. The original roof was replaced with a thermoplastic membrane through 2016 to 2017. In the summer of 2018, the original ice-level concrete floor and cooling system was replaced.

Notable events

1978 – Rush – A Farewell to Kings Tour (w/ Max Webster)
1978 – Nazareth – Expect No Mercy Tour (w/ The Guess Who)
1978 – Gordon Lightfoot
1979 – First performance of Royal Nova Scotia International Tattoo; held annually since 1979 
1979 – Billy Graham – Atlantic Canada Crusade
1981 – Ted Nugent
1981 – Van Halen - Fair Warning Tour
1982 – Loverboy – Get Lucky Tour (w/ Bryan Adams)
1983 – Loverboy – Keep It Up Tour (w/ The Headpins)
1984 – John Denver
1984 – Billy Idol – Rebel Yell Tour (w/ Platinum Blonde)
1984 – April Wine – One More for the Road Tour (w/ Corey Hart)
1984 – Aerosmith – Back in the Saddle Tour (w/ Honeymoon Suite)
1984 – Frank Zappa – Them or Us Tour
1984 – Iron Maiden – Powerslave Tour (w/ Twisted Sister)
1984 – Krokus (w/ Accept & Rough Cutt)
1985 – Tina Turner – Private Dancer Tour
1985 – Triumph – Thunder Seven Tour (w/ Helix)
1986 – Kim Mitchell – Shakin' Like a Human Being Tour (w/ Haywire)
1986 – George Thorogood (w/ Johnny Winter)
1987 – The Cult (w/ Guns N' Roses) – Appetite for Destruction Tour
1987 – Triumph – Sport of Kings Tour (w/ Brighton Rock)
1987 – Diet Coke International Women's Tennis Tournament
1987 – Alice Cooper – Constrictor Tour (w/ Sword)
1988 – Alice Cooper – Live In the Flesh Tour (w/ Motörhead)
1988 – Stevie Ray Vaughan – Live Alive Tour (w/ The Stray Cats)
1988 – Iron Maiden – Seventh Tour of a Seventh Tour (w/ Guns N' Roses)
1989 – Metallica – Damaged Justice Tour (w/ Queensrÿche)
1989 – Cheap Trick (w/ Eddie Money)
1990 – Alice Cooper – Trash Tour (w/ Great White)
1990 – World Figure Skating Championships
1991 - Paul Simon - The Rhythm of the Saints Tour
1991 – Iron Maiden – No Prayer on the Road Tour (w/ Anthrax)
1992 – WBL Basketball All Star game
1992 – 1992 Scott Tournament of Hearts
1993 – Metallica – Nowhere Else To Roam Tour
1993 - Bon Jovi - I'll Sleep When I'm Dead Tour
1993 – WWF Superstars of Wrestling TV Tapings
1993 – Aerosmith – Get a Grip Tour (w/ Too Many Cooks)
1995 – 1995 Labatt Brier Green Day Dookie Tour
1996 – Alan Jackson (w/ Faith Hill)
1996 – Garth Brooks – The Garth Brooks World Tour
1996 – Anne Murray - This show was taped for DVD and CD An Intimate Evening with Anne Murray
1997 – WWE Raw Live TV Tapings
1997 – Backstreet Boys – Backstreet's Back Tour
1998 – Our Lady Peace (w/ Everclear)
1998 – Celine Dion – Let's Talk About Love World Tour
1998 – Van Morrison
1999 – Alanis Morissette (w/ Crash Test Dummies)
1999 – The Tragically Hip – Phantom Power Tour (w/ By Divine Right)
2000 – Canadian Hockey League 2000 Memorial Cup
2002 – Nelly Furtado
2003 – 2003 World Junior Ice Hockey Championships
2003 – 2003 Nokia Brier
2003 – WWE Raw & Smackdown T.V. Tapings 
2004 – 2004 IIHF Women's World Championship
2004 – Cher – Living Proof: The Farewell Tour (w/ Tommy Drake)
2004 – Nickelback (w/ Three Days Grace and The Trews)
2004 – Kid Rock – Rock N Roll Pain Train Tour
2005 – Pearl Jam – North American Tour (w/ Sleater-Kinney)
2005 – 50 Cent (w/ Kardinal Offishall)
2006 – 2006 Juno Awards
2006 – Dixie Chicks – Accidents & Accusations Tour
2007 – Cirque Du Soleil – Saltimbanco  Guns N' Roses
2007 – Barenaked Ladies – Barenaked Ladies Are Me (B.L.A.M.) Tour
2008 – Ozzy Osbourne – Black Rain Tour
2008 – Michael Bublé – Irresponsible Tour
2008 – 2008 IIHF World Championship
2008 – Elton John – Rocket Man: Greatest Hits Live
2008 – Neil Young 
2008 – Carrie Underwood
2009 – Stone Temple Pilots
2010 – 2010 Tim Hortons Brier 
2011 – 2011 Canada Winter Games
2011 – Heart
2011 – Bachman & Turner
2011 – Prince – Welcome 2 Tour
2011 – Pixies – Doolittle Tour
2012 – Tom Petty and the Heartbreakers
2013 – CHL/NHL Top Prospects Game
2013 – Leonard Cohen
2013 – Rush – Clockwork Angels Tour
2013 – KISS – Monster World Tour (w/ Shinedown)
2014 – Chicago
2014 – George Thorogood and The Destroyers - 40 Years Strong Tour
2014 – Black Sabbath – 13 Tour (w/ Reignwolf)
2014 – 2014 Davis Cup World Group Play-offs
2014 – We Day
2014 – UFC Fight Night: MacDonald vs. Saffiedine
2014 – Alice In Chains
2014 – Sarah McLachlan
2014 – Bob Seger & The Silver Bullet Band – Ride Out Tour
2014 – Backstreet Boys – In A World Like This Tour
2015 – 2015 Ford World Men's Curling Championship
2015 – Judas Priest – Redeemer of Souls Tour (w/Mastodon)
2015 – 2015 CIS University Cup
2016 – 2016 CIS University Cup
2016 – Carly Rae Jepsen
2017 – UFC Fight Night: Lewis vs. Browne
2017 – Jim Gaffigan Noble Ape Tour
2017 – Canada vs Bahamas men's basketball game for the 2019 FIBA Basketball World Cup qualification
2018 – 2018 U Sports Men's Basketball Championship
2018 – Jack White
2018 – Theory of a Deadman
2019 – 2019 U Sports Men's Basketball Championship
2019 – Canadian Hockey League 2019 Memorial Cup
2019 – Monster Jam
2019 – Barack Obama
2019 – Sum 41
2019 – Metric
2019 – Daniel Caesar
2022 – Sting - My Songs Tour
2022 – Avril Lavigne - Bite Me Tour
2022 – Trevor Noah - Back to Abnormal World Tour
2022 – Simple Plan
2023 – 2023 World Junior Ice Hockey Championships
2024 – 2024 Juno Awards

References

External links

 Official web site
 Halifax Thunderbirds Official Site
 Halifax Mooseheads Official Site
 Halifax Hurricanes Official Site 
 Arena review
 Halifax Metro Centre at Hockeyarenas.net

Sports venues in Halifax, Nova Scotia
American Basketball Association (2000–present) venues
Boxing venues in Canada
Basketball venues in Canada
Halifax Rainmen
Halifax Hurricanes
Halifax Thunderbirds
Indoor lacrosse venues in Canada
Indoor arenas in Nova Scotia
Indoor ice hockey venues in Canada
Music venues in Halifax, Nova Scotia
Nova Scotia Voyageurs
Quebec Major Junior Hockey League arenas
Scotiabank
2011 Canada Winter Games
Sports venues completed in 1978
1978 establishments in Nova Scotia